Mark Rashid is an American horse trainer and clinician from Estes Park, Colorado. Practicing within the western riding tradition, Rashid's philosophy involves understanding the horse's point of view and solving difficult problems with communication rather than force.  His methodology emphasizes the relationship between horse and rider as a partnership, in which the horse willingly takes direction from the rider, rather than a dominant rider directing a submissive horse.

While Rashid is grouped as a practitioner within the field of natural horsemanship, he personally tends to avoid that classification and has publicly expressed discomfort with the term when applied to himself and to horsemanship in general.

He has written a number of books on his philosophy, including Big Horses, Good Dogs, & Straight Fences, Horsemanship Through Life, Life Lessons from a Ranch Horse, Horses Never Lie, A Good  Horse is Never a Bad Color, Considering the Horse, and Nature in Horsemanship: Discovering Harmony Through Principles of Aikido.

A unique aspect of Rashid's work is that he is also a practitioner of Yoshinkan aikido and applies its principles to the art of riding.

References

External links
Official website

Year of birth missing (living people)
Living people
People from Estes Park, Colorado
American horse trainers
Western horse trainers